Kulgun is a locality in the Scenic Rim Region, Queensland, Australia.

Geography 
The principal land use is grazing with a small amount of cropping.

History 
The locality takes its name from its former railway station. The station was originally called Schneiders Road, but was changed by the Queensland Railway Department in 1908. Kulgun is an Aboriginal word meaning track or road.

The Fassifern railway line (Queensland's first branch railway line) opened from Ipswich to Harrisville on 10 July 1882. On 12 September 1887 the line was extended to Dugundan with Kulgun being served by Kulgun railway station on Kulgun Road. The line closed in June 1964.

The locality contained 23 households, in which 52.2% of the population were males and 47.8% of the population were females with a median age of 38, the same as the national average. The average weekly household income was $1,583, $145 below the national average.

Education 
There are no schools in Kulgun. The nearest primary schools are in Roadvale and Kalbar. The nearest secondary school is in Boonah.

References 

Scenic Rim Region
Localities in Queensland